Andrea Clark is an African American photographer living in Asheville, North Carolina. She is best known for her black and white photographs that document Asheville's East End community taken around 1968 -1971. In 2020 Clark was awarded the Sondley Award by the Historic Resources Commission of Asheville & Buncombe County.

"Andrea Clark's photographs capture the full spectrum of community life in Asheville's East End in 1970. The images portray a neighborhood with bustling business and street life, gardens where people grew their own food, and sidewalks on which children played under the watchful eyes of elders."

The East End had been a vibrant black community since the 1880s but by 1978 urban renewal had razed much of it and families were relocated to other neighborhoods.

References 

American women photographers
Living people
African-American photographers
People from Asheville, North Carolina
Date of birth missing (living people)
Place of birth missing (living people)
Year of birth missing (living people)
21st-century African-American people
21st-century African-American women